"Right Hand Hi" is the fourth single taken from the album Ultraviolet by Kid Sister.

Critical reception
Aylin Zafar of URB described the song as "an undeniable club banger."

Live performances
Kid Sister performed the song "Right Hand Hi" as the featured musical guest on Episode 149 of the show Late Night with Jimmy Fallon on November 13, 2009.

Song usage
Dance crew Poreotics performed to "Right Hand Hi" in Episode 6: Illusion Challenge of America's Best Dance Crew.

Track listings
UK CD single
 "Right Hand Hi (Extended Version)" - 4:41
 "Right Hand Hi (Riton Vocal Rub)" - 3:39
 "Right Hand Hi (Riton Redub)" - 5:23
 "Right Hand Hi (Caspa Remix)" - 4:26
 "Right Hand Hi (Greenmoney Remix)" - 5:00
 "Right Hand Hi (Kim Fai Remix)" - 7:04
 "Right Hand Hi (Kim Fai Dub)" - 6:47
 	   
U.S. CD single
 "Right Hand Hi" - 3:22
 "Right Hand Hi (Instrumental)" - 3:22
 "Right Hand Hi (Kill The Noise Remix)" - 5:12
 "Right Hand Hi (Kingdom Remix)" - 3:50

Charts

References

2009 singles
Kid Sister songs
2009 songs
Songs written by Steve Angello
Songs written by Sebastian Ingrosso
Asylum Records singles
Song recordings produced by Steve Angello